State Trunk Highway 138 (often called Highway 138, STH-138 or WIS 138) is a state highway in the U.S. state of Wisconsin. It runs west–east between Oregon and Stoughton and north–south between Stoughton and Cooksville.

Route description

WIS 138 starts in Cooksville, an unincorporated community with an Evansville address. It runs north into Dane County towards Stoughton, although it makes one S-bend on the way. In Stoughton, it turns west with US 51. It runs concurrently with US 51 to the west side of the city, then continues west in a straight line towards Oregon. It becomes Janesville Street once it crosses US 14.

History
Starting in 1923, WIS 138 was formed to travel roughly along its present-day route from WIS 10/WIS 106 (now US 51/WIS 138) in Stoughton to WIS 59 in Cooksville. Up until 1962, no major change to the routing had happened. Then, WIS 138 superseded part of WIS 106 from Stoughton to US 14 near Oregon. In late-1978, US 14 was moved onto a newly built expressway around Oregon. As a result, WIS 138 no longer needed to travel southwestward to get to US 14. Instead, it then continuously traveled westward to get to US 14.

Major intersections

See also

References

External links

138
Transportation in Rock County, Wisconsin
Transportation in Dane County, Wisconsin